Paratheocris obliqua is a species of beetle in the family Cerambycidae. It was described by Karl Jordan in 1903. It is known from Gabon.

References

Endemic fauna of Gabon
Theocridini
Beetles described in 1903